What a Life is the sixth studio album by Australian recording artist Adam Brand. The album was released in August 2006 and peaked at number 28 on the ARIA charts. It was certified gold in 2006.

The album was nominated for ARIA Award for Best Country Album at the ARIA Music Awards of 2006 This is Brand's fourth ARIA Award nomination in this category.

Track listing

Charts

Weekly charts

Year-end charts

Certifications

Release history

References

2006 albums
Adam Brand (musician) albums
Sony Music Australia albums